Warner Music Africa (formerly Warner Music South Africa) is a music corporation of the global record label Warner Music Group, founded on 5 December 2013. with its South Africa arm managing artist development, marketing, and distribution for Warner Music artists in Africa, with its corporate headquarters located in 1 Saxon Rd, Hyde Park, Sandton, 2196, Johannesburg, South Africa.

Overview
Warner Music South Africa was founded on 5 December 2013, following the buyout of Gallo Records share of the joint venture Warner Music Gallo Africa as a division of Warner Music Group. Following the launching of the imprint, WMG appoints the former Warner Music Gallo Africa general manager Tracy Fraser, as the managing director of Warner Music South Africa. Tracy participated in the signing of Josh Kempen, Locnville, Mango Groove, Janie Bay, Dr Bone, Zahara, Julanie J, Masandi, Faith K, CKay, and Diamond Platnumz, with a 360 partnership deal between WMG, and WCB Wasafi. Tracy stepped down from her position in 2021.

On 22 March 2021, Temi Adeniji was appointed by WMG with the combined role of managing director of Warner Music South Africa and SVP, Strategy, of Sub-Saharan Africa. Temi participated in the signing of Kiddo CSA, Sizwe Alakine, and Rouge. On 16 September 2021, Temi participated in the buying of Coleske, one of South Africa largest independent label. Prior to May 2022, Warner Music South Africa began operating as Warner Music Africa. The news was broken by Temi Adeniji, at an exclusive launch held on 11 May 2022 at Warner Music offices in Hyde Park. On 23 June 2022, Warner Music Africa launched a brand strategy division.

The brand strategy division of Warner Music Africa was led by the entertainment lawyer Thembi Mpungose-Niklas, who was appointed. Thembi is to report directly to WMA managing director and senior vice-president of special projects in sub-Saharan Africa Temi Adeniji. On 5th July 2022, Warner Music Group, Blavatnik Family Foundation, and Social Justice Fund announce the launch of the SJF Repertoire Fund, an eight-year $10M initiative that allows WMG employees in participating regions to get involved, making Warner Music Africa, one of its team to receive $1M to be disbursed in Sub-Saharan Africa, by nominating local organizations for grants from $5,000-$15,000 USD.

Warner Music Africa announced its first set of SJF Repertoire Fund grantee partners for Sub-Saharan Africa, would include organizations across Ethiopia, Ghana, Kenya, Nigeria, and South Africa.  On the same day, Warner Music Africa approved grants to the following African organizations, including African Leadership Academy (South Africa), African Digital Media Institute (Kenya), AgroEknor Farmers Education & Empowerment Program (Nigeria), ArtNg (Nigeria), Edugrant (Nigeria), Fair Justice Initiative (Ghana), Kids Haven (South Africa), Rele Arts Foundation (Nigeria), The Sarz Academy Academy Foundation (Nigeria), The Tag Foundation (South Africa), The Tomorrow Trust (South Africa), Zoma Museum (Ethiopia), and WeThinkCode_ (South Africa).

Warner Music Gallo Africa
In 2006, Johnnic Communications (Gallo's parent company, which changed its name to Avusa in November 2007) entered a joint venture with the South African division of Warner Music Group and established Warner Music Gallo Africa. The Gallo Record Company's entire music archive digitally available for the first time. These include rare pressings as well as classic hits by artists such as Ladysmith Black Mambazo, Mahlathini and the Mahotella Queens, Miriam Makeba, Hugh Masekela, Letta Mbulu, Spokes Mashiyane, Lucky Dube, Yvonne Chaka Chaka and others. The joint venture ended in December 2013.

Partnerships

Flume
On 22 August 2019, WM South Africa announce a partnership deal with Flume, a digital marketing agency.

WCB Wasafi
On 18 May 2022, Warner Music Group announced a new 360 partnership deal with Diamond Platnumz and his leading independent record label WCB Wasafi. The new deal will see WCB Wasafi incorporated into Warner Music South Africa and Ziiki Media.

Managing directors
Tracy Fraser 
Temi Adeniji

Artists

Josh Kempen
Locnville
Janie Bay
Mango Groove
Dr Bone
Zahara
Julanie J
Masandi
Faith K
CKay
Diamond Platnumz
Kiddo CSA
Rouge
Sizwe Alakine
Superstar Ace
Ash
Mvzzle
pH Raw X
BigStar Johnson
Zandie Khumalo
CampMasters

Selected discography
Singles, Albums and Eps, released through Warner Music Africa:

Singles

References

Record label distributors
2013 establishments in South Africa
Warner Music labels
Warner Music Group